Dominus Flevit (Latin, "the Lord wept") is a Roman Catholic church on the Mount of Olives, opposite the walls of the Old City of Jerusalem. During construction of the sanctuary, archaeologists uncovered artifacts dating back to the Canaanite period, as well as tombs from the Second Temple and Byzantine eras.

History 
According to the 19th chapter of the Gospel of Luke, Jesus, while riding toward the city of Jerusalem, becomes overwhelmed by the beauty of the Second Temple and predicting its future destruction, and the diaspora of the Jewish people, weeps openly (an event known as Flevit super illam in Latin).

The present church of Dominus Flevit is built upon the foundations of an earlier Byzantine church, which, like most churches, faced east. It was during the Crusader era that people began commemorating the location. After the fall of Jerusalem in 1187, the church fell into ruin. In the early sixteenth century a mosque or madrasah existed at the site, presumably built by the Turks, from the remains of the earlier church, although the exact use is disputed. This place was known as el Mansouriyeh (The Triumphant) and also el Khelweh (The Hermitage).

The Franciscans were unable to obtain the ruins, so, in 1891 they purchased a small plot of land nearby and built a small chapel there. In 1913 a small private home was built in front of the Franciscan chapel by one Miss Mellon. This home eventually passed to the Sisters of St. Joseph, who eventually sold it to a Portuguese woman.

Archaeology
In 1940, the Benedictine Sisters sold part of the property to the Franciscans. The old boundary wall was moved at this time to make the division. In 1953 the Franciscans began construction of another wall. While digging the foundations, workers unearthed ancient tombs. Excavations began at the site, led by Fr. Bellarmino Bagatti, OFM.

Tombs
A Canaanite tomb from the Late Bronze Age, as well as a necropolis used from 136 BC to AD 300 were discovered. The necropolis spanned two separate periods, characterized by differing tomb styles. The earlier Second Temple era tombs were of the kokh style, while the Byzantine era section was composed of tombs with arcosolium from the 3rd and 4th centuries AD. A Byzantine monastery from the 5th century was also discovered. Mosaics from this monastery still remain at the site.

Byzantine mosaic
The Byzantine mosaic floor, dating to the beginning of the seventh century CE. The floor is surrounded by ribbons and wave motifs. The centre of the carpet is divided by squares containing round frames. The circles contain fruit, vegetables, flowers and fish. The Byzantine mosaic attest to the importance of agriculture for the people of the period. The motifs reflect the developed and progressive agriculture of Byzantine Palestine including Jerusalem. Some images also contain unique elements, as for instance luffa for the producing of bathing sponges, edible Snakes Melons, and figs tied by a blue string. Parts of the Byzantine mosaic can also be seen inside the modern church building, with a limestone slab bearing a large cross in the middle (fig. 2 in the gallery below).

Architecture
Located on the western slope of the Mount of Olives, the church was designed and constructed between 1953 and 1955 by the Italian architect Antonio Barluzzi and is held in trust by the Franciscan Custody of the Holy Land. Dominus Flevit, which translates from Latin as "The Lord Wept", was fashioned in the shape of a teardrop to symbolize the tears of Christ.

Picture gallery

References

External links 

 Dominus Flevit: history of the site
 Dominus Flevit — Jerusalem Photos Portal
 The Franciscan Custody of the Holy Land
 VR Panoramic Images of Dominus Flevit Church 
Photos of the Dominus Flevit Church at the Manar al-Athar photo archive

Further reading 
 Bellarmino Bagatti and Milik, 1968. Gli scavi del Dominus Flevit An account of the excavations, 1953–55.

Roman Catholic churches in Jerusalem
Franciscan churches in Palestine
Mount of Olives
Roman Catholic churches completed in 1955
20th-century Roman Catholic church buildings
1955 establishments in Jordan